In geometry, the small icosihemidodecahedron (or small icosahemidodecahedron) is a uniform star polyhedron, indexed as . It has 26 faces (20 triangles and 6 decagons), 60 edges, and 30 vertices. Its vertex figure alternates two regular triangles and decagons as a crossed quadrilateral. It is a hemipolyhedron with its six decagonal faces passing through the model center.

It is given a Wythoff symbol,  but that construction represents a double covering of this model.

Related polyhedra 

It shares its edge arrangement with the icosidodecahedron (its convex hull, having the triangular faces in common), and with the small dodecahemidodecahedron (having the decagonal faces in common).

See also 
 Pentakis icosidodecahedron
 List of uniform polyhedra

References

External links 
 
 Uniform polyhedra and duals

Polyhedra